Ndera Neuropsychiatric Teaching Hospital, Known as Caraes Ndera Hospital, is a teaching hospital in Rwanda that provides specialized healthcare in psychiatry and neurology. Founded in 1968, the hospital is located in Ndera Sector, Gasabo District in City of Kigali. The hospital is owned by the Congregation of the Brothers of Charity in partnership with the Government Rwanda, with the Government supporting the hospital in human resource and administrative matters, and the congregation assuring the daily management of the hospital.
Following its inauguration, Ndera Neuropsychiatric Teaching Hospital established two branches; CARAES Butare in Huye District, Southern Province in 1976 and Icyizere Psychotherapeutic Centre, in Kicukiro District, City of Kigali in 2003. The most prevalent pathology in psychiatry department at the hospital is schizophrenia, while the predominant pathology in neurology department is epilepsy.

On April 09, 2022, the Cabinet of Rwanda approved the Prime Minister's instructions determining organizational structure of Ndera Hospital, upgrading the facility to a University Teaching Hospital Level, also on the same day, nine other hospitals were upgraded to the Level Two Teaching Hospital, to increase workforce in the health sector. The new organizational structure was published in the Official Gazette of 11th August 2022.

History 
The hospital was founded in 1968 by the congregation of the Brothers of Charity at the request of the Rwandan Government and the Catholic Church. Before the introduction of Ndera Hospital, psychiatric patients were prisoned. When the first patients were admitted to the hospital in 1974, it had a capacity of 40 beds, but 3 years later, the beds were increased to 140. In 1977, a special home for chronic psychiatric patients was built with a capacity of 12 beds. As the patients increased, the hospital established CARAES Butare in 1978 to decentralize its services, and 25 years later, they opened a particular branch, Icyizere Psychotherapeutic Center, to take care of people with trauma and those with addiction issues.

Statistics 
In October 2022, the hospital announced that 96,357 patients were received in the year 2021–2022, which is 29.6 per cent increase compared to previous year. Number of cases related to depression also increased, as the hospital recorded 7,817 cases.

External links 
Ndera Neuropsychiatric Teaching Hospital on Twitter

References 

Hospitals in Rwanda
Psychiatric hospitals
1968 establishments in Rwanda
Gasabo District
Brothers of Charity

.